Marxist–Leninist Communist Organisation of Réunion' was a Maoist-oriented communist organisation in Réunion. OCMLR was founded in 1975, by a group that had left the Reunionese Communist Party. OCMLR strongly advocated independence for Réunion. OCMLR was the predecessor of the Reunionese Independence Movement (MIR).

References

Political parties in Réunion
Political parties established in 1975
Communist parties in Réunion
Maoist organizations in France
Separatism in France
1975 establishments in Réunion